The following Confederate States Army units and commanders fought in the Little Rock campaign, also known as the advance on Little Rock, of the American Civil War on August 25 to September 10, 1863.

Abbreviations used

Military rank 
 LTG = Lieutenant General
 MG = Major General
 BG = Brigadier General
 Col = Colonel
 Ltc = Lieutenant Colonel
 Maj = Major
 Cpt = Captain

Other 
 w = wounded
 mw = mortally wounded
 k = killed

District of Arkansas 
MG Sterling Price

See also 
 List of Arkansas Civil War Confederate units
 Lists of American Civil War Regiments by State
 Confederate Units by State
 Arkansas in the American Civil War
 Arkansas Militia in the Civil War

References

External links 
 Community & Conflict:  The Impact of the Civil War In the Ozarks
 Edward G. Gerdes Civil War Home Page
 The Encyclopedia of Arkansas History and Culture
 The War of the Rebellion: a Compilation of the Official Records of the Union and Confederate Armies
 The Arkansas History Commission, State Archives, Civil War in Arkansas

1863 in Arkansas
Advance on Little Rock (American Civil War)
American Civil War orders of battle
Arkansas in the American Civil War
Conflicts in 1863
Military in Arkansas
Military units and formations in Arkansas